Tang Guoqiang (born 4 May 1952) is a Chinese actor best known for portraying historical figures in several films and television series. Some of his more notable roles include: various Chinese emperors (e.g. Emperor Taizong of Tang, Yongle Emperor, Yongzheng Emperor), Zhuge Liang, Yan Zhenqing and Mao Zedong. Tang started his acting career when he first joined a performance troupe in 1970 after graduating from middle school. He made his film debut in 1975 as the male lead in Storm over the South China Sea. He is also a member of the Chinese Calligraphy Society.

Early life and education
Tang was born in Qingdao, Shandong, on 4 May 1952, while his ancestral home in Yantai. After graduating from Qingdao No.39 High School, he joined the Qingdao Drama Troupe in 1970 and then the August First Film Studio in 1975.

Acting career
Tang rise to fame started in 1979, with his role in the military-themed film Little Flower, becoming something of a pop idol after his appearance in the mythological romance flick, Peacock Princess, in 1982. In 1990, Tang played the ancient politician and strategist Zhuge Liang in the epic TV drama Romance of Three Kingdoms, and through the years he would become a specialist interpreting historic figures, such as Li Shimin and Yongzheng.

He is also well known for his performances of Mao Zedong, starting in 1996, when Tang starred with Li Lin and Ma Xiaowei in Zhai Junjie's war film The Long March. Since then, he has represented the “Great Helmsman” in over 40 television dramas and movies.

Personal life
Tang is married to actress Zhuang Li and they have a son named Tang Yinghan (born in 1995). Tang also has a daughter named Tang Lili (born in 1983) from a previous marriage to Sun Tao.

Filmography

Film

Television

References

External links
dianying.com
HK Cinemagic
 

 

1952 births
Living people
Male actors from Qingdao
Chinese male television actors
Chinese male film actors
20th-century Chinese male actors
21st-century Chinese male actors